Jan Willemsz Lapp (1585 – 1663), was a Dutch Golden Age landscape painter.

Biography
He was born in The Hague and travelled to Rome in 1605. On his return he became a member of the Guild of St. Luke in The Hague in 1625. He was last registered in Leiden in 1662 and in Amsterdam in 1663. It is unknown where he died.

References

Jan Willemsz. Lapp on Artnet

1585 births
1663 deaths
Dutch Golden Age painters
Dutch male painters
Artists from The Hague
Painters from The Hague
Landscape painters